Edgar Bennett III (born February 15, 1969) is an American football coach and former running back who is the wide receivers coach for the Las Vegas Raiders of the National Football League (NFL). Bennett played college football at Florida State and was drafted by the Green Bay Packers in the 4th round of the 1992 NFL Draft. He also played for the Chicago Bears.

Early years
Bennett attended Robert E. Lee High School  in Jacksonville, Florida and won varsity letters in football, basketball, and track. Influenced by football coach Corky Rogers, he was a Class 4A All-State running back, and was a SuperPrep All-Dixie selection.

Playing career

College
Bennett attended Florida State University. He lined up primarily at fullback in a backfield that included future NFL running backs Amp Lee, Marquette Smith, William Floyd, Zach Crockett and Sean Jackson. When Lee was suspended for the Cotton Bowl, Bennett started at halfback.
Bennett is considered one of the most versatile fullbacks in FSU history. His career all-purpose yardage totaled more than 2,300 on 389 touches, good for 20 touchdowns. He was an all-around player who ran a 4.5 40 and caught 93 passes for over 1,000 yards.

National Football League

Green Bay Packers
Bennett was drafted in the 4th round (103rd overall) by the Packers in the 1992 NFL Draft. Bennett started his Packer career as a fullback, but he became the starting running back in 1995 and gained 1,067 yards rushing. As both a fullback and a running back, Bennett excelled as a receiver leading the Packers in receptions. He continued as the starting running back throughout the 1996 season, but in the latter half, Dorsey Levens was receiving significant playing time at running back. Bennett's career as a Packer culminated in their Super Bowl XXXI victory. He ruptured his Achilles tendon in the 1997 preseason and did not play that year.

Chicago Bears

Bennett played with the Chicago Bears in 1998 and 1999 before retiring after the 1999 season.

NFL career statistics

Coaching career

Green Bay Packers

Bennett rejoined the Packer organization in 2001 as director of player development. He later served as running backs coach for six seasons. In February 2011, Bennett was named wide receivers coach. In February 2015, Packers head coach Mike McCarthy promoted Bennett to offensive coordinator.

Oakland / Las Vegas Raiders

On January 13, 2018, Bennett was hired by the Oakland Raiders as their wide receivers coach under head coach Jon Gruden. On February 2 2022, the team announced it would retain Bennett under new head coach Josh McDaniels.

Personal life
Edgar's daughter Elyse Bennett was the seventh overall pick in the 2022 NWSL Draft to KC Current.

References

External links
 Green Bay Packers bio

1969 births
Living people
American football running backs
Florida State Seminoles football players
Green Bay Packers players
Green Bay Packers coaches
Chicago Bears players
Players of American football from Jacksonville, Florida
National Football League offensive coordinators
Oakland Raiders coaches
Las Vegas Raiders coaches
Robert E. Lee High School (Jacksonville) alumni